Điện Biên Đông is a rural district of Điện Biên province in the Northwest region of Vietnam. The district is predominantly mountainous. The district was established in 1995.

As of 2003 the district had a population of 48,990. The district covers an area of 1,206 km². The district capital lies at Mường Luân, although the only town in the district is Điện Biên Đông.

Geography
The district lies in the southeastern part of Điện Biên Province, to the immediate southeast of Điện Biên Phủ City, south of Tuần Giáo district, east of Điện Biên district, north/northwest of Sốp Cộp district and west of Sông Mã district and Thuận Châu district in Sơn La province.

Điện Biên Đông is located at an average elevation of 900–1000 m. The land is dominated by many streams and mountains which account for 90% of natural land. The main river is the Nậm Mạ River which flows through the central part of the district. Điện Biên Đông has a tropical climate, influenced each year by two large air masses: the northern dry air, and the cold and hot humid air from the south. Average rainfall is from 1600–1700 mm, falling mostly in June, and the average temperature throughout the year is 22 degrees Celsius. The ethnic composition is as follows: Hmong (53.73%), Thai (32.06%), Lao (2.9%), Kho Mu (5.96%) and Sinh Mun (3.46%), with the remainder being minorities.

Administrative divisions
Điện Biên Đông has 14 administrative units, including a township and 13 communes:

 Điện Biên Đông township
 Chiềng Sơ
 Háng Lìa
 Keo Lôm
 Luân Giới
 Mường Luân
 Na Son
 Nong U
 Phì Nhừ
 Phình Giàng
 Pu Nhi
 Pú Hồng
 Tìa Dình
 Xa Dung

Economy
The main agricultural commodities are rice, corn, peanuts, betel nuts, cotton, tea and products from livestock farming. Điện Biên Đông district has reserves of gold ore, lead and zinc. Many of the Thai inhabitants live in two colonnade homes with wooden floors, usually along the streams and mainly farm rice and weave. There is a notable tower in the commune of Mường Luân, classified as a national monument in 1981. National Route 130 passes through the central part of the district.

References

External links
Photograph

Districts of Điện Biên province
Điện Biên province